The table below details the Grand Prix results of the other teams for which Ferrari was/is an engine supplier.

Complete Formula One World Championship results

First supplies (1956–1966)
(key)

Support of the fellow Italian teams (1991–1993)
(key)

Return to the role of supplier (2006–2009)
(key)

2010s
(key)

2020s
(key)

Notes
* – Season still in progress.
† – The driver did not finish the Grand Prix, but was classified, as he completed over 90% of the race distance.
 – The World Constructors' Championship did not exist before .

References

Formula One constructor results
Ferrari in motorsport